John Olorunfemi Onaiyekan (born 29 January 1944) is a Nigerian prelate of the Roman Catholic Church. He was Archbishop of Abuja from 1994 to 2019 and was made a cardinal in 2012. He has served as president of the Christian Association of Nigeria, president of the Catholic Bishops' Conference of Nigeria and Bishop of Ilorin.

Education and early career
Onaiyekan was born in the town of Kabba, in what is now Kogi State, to Bartholomew and Joann Onaiyekan. He attended St. Mary's Catholic School in Kabba from 1949 until 1956, Mount St. Michael's Secondary School in Aliade, Benue State, from 1957 until 1962, and Ss. Peter & Paul Major Seminary in Bodija, Ibadan, from 1963 until 1965. He completed his religious studies in Rome in 1969 and was ordained as a priest on 3 August of that year by Bishop Auguste Delisle of Lokoja Diocese. Ahmadu Bello, Premier of Nigeria's Northern Region, had offered him a scholarship to study abroad.

Onaiyekan taught at St. Kizito's College, Isanlu, in 1969. He became rector of St. Clement Junior Seminary in Lokoja in 1971. He completed his Licentiate of Sacred Scripture at the Pontifical Biblical Institute in 1973 and earned his doctorate in 1976. He became Vice Rector of Ss. Peter & Paul in 1977.

Church leader
In October 1980, Pope John Paul II named Onaiyekan to a five-year term on the International Theological Commission. In November, he joined the International Catholic/Methodist Dialogue Commission.

Onaiyekan was appointed Auxiliary Bishop of Ilorin, Kwara State, and titular bishop of Thunusuda on 10 September 1982. He received his episcopal consecration on 6 January 1983 by Pope John Paul II. He was named Bishop of Ilorin on 20 October 1984. On 7 July 1990 he was appointed Coadjutor Bishop of the Abuja. When that diocese became an Archdiocese on 26 March 1994, Onaiyekan became its first archbishop.

Onaiyekan was elected Vice-President of the Catholic Bishops' Conference of Nigeria (CBCN) in 1994 and President of that body in 2000. 

During the administration of Nigerian President Olusegun Obasanjo, and especially during his second term between 2004 and 2007, Onaiyekan spoke out against the regime for its failure to support democratic principles and its corruption. Speaking in a service in his cathedral in 2005 with the president in attendance, he called on Obasanjo to resist the temptation to stand for a third term, which the Nigerian constitution did not allow, and asked him to "resist the deadly temptation to want to remain in power perpetually by hook or by crook". His stance was credited with saving Nigeria from the imposition of a dictatorship. He was named Pax Christi International's 2012 Peace Laureate.

On 18 September 2012, Pope Benedict XVI named  Onaiyekan one of the Synod Fathers for the October 2012 Ordinary General Assembly of the Synod of Bishops on the New Evangelization.

He was created a cardinal by Pope Benedict XVI in a consistory on 24 November 2012. As Cardinal-Priest he was assigned to the titular church of San Saturnino.

On 31 January 2013, Pope Benedict XVI appointed Onaiyekan a member of the Congregation for the Doctrine of the Faith (CDF) and a member of the Presidential Committee of the Pontifical Council for the Family. He can hold these positions until his 80th birthday.

He was one of the cardinal electors who participated in the 2013 papal conclave that elected Pope Francis.

Pope Francis appointed Onaiyekan the Apostolic Administrator of the diocese of Ahiara in Imo State in eastern Nigeria on 3 July 2013.

Pope Francis appointed him to a five-year renewable term as a member of the Congregation for Divine Worship and the Discipline of the Sacraments in October 2016.

He won the election for the position of Christian Association of Nigeria (CAN) President on 19 June 2007 with 72 votes over Anglican Primate Peter Akinola who had 33 votes. In 2010 he was succeeded by Ayo Oritsejafor.

Pope Francis accepted his resignation as Archbishop of Abuja on 9 November 2019.

Honours 

 Pax Christi International Peace Award, 2012

Works
"The Priesthood in Pre-monarchial Ancient Israel and among the Owe-Yoruba of Kabba: A Comparative Study", unpublished dissertation (1976)
"The shariah in Nigeria: a Christian view", Bulletin on Islam & Christian-Muslim Relations in Africa (1987)

References

External links

 
 
Roman Catholic Archdiocese of Abuja official website

20th-century Roman Catholic archbishops in Nigeria
People from Kogi State
1944 births
Living people
Nigerian Roman Catholics
Yoruba Christian clergy
Nigerian cardinals
Bishops appointed by Pope John Paul II
Christian Association of Nigeria Presidents
Cardinals created by Pope Benedict XVI
Members of the Congregation for the Doctrine of the Faith
Members of the Congregation for Divine Worship and the Discipline of the Sacraments
Roman Catholic archbishops of Abuja
Roman Catholic bishops of Ilorin
21st-century Roman Catholic archbishops in Nigeria